Sawyer is an occupational term referring to someone who saws wood, particularly using a pit saw either in a saw pit or with the log on trestles above ground or operates a sawmill. One such job is the occupation of someone who cuts lumber to length for the consumer market, a task now often done by end users or at lumber and home improvement stores.

The term is still widely used in the logging industry to refer to the operator of a chainsaw (or still in some limited applications, a crosscut saw) for harvesting, wildfire suppression, trail construction and related work. In the construction industry, the term is applied to the operator of a concrete saw.

See also
 Hewing
 Wood splitting

References

Construction trades workers
Forestry occupations
Logging
Saws
Timber preparation